Angus Monfries (born 19 January 1987) is a former professional Australian rules footballer who played for the Essendon Football Club and Port Adelaide Football Club in the Australian Football League (AFL). Monfries played as a forward pocket or half forward.

AFL career 
Monfries was drafted by the Bombers with selection 14 in the 2004 AFL draft. He played football for Walkerville Junior Football Club before moving to Melbourne. He made his debut in Round 1, 2005 against Melbourne, which saw him become the 200th player to have played under coach Kevin Sheedy. Monfries maintained his position in the senior side until round 4, but was dropped for the Anzac Day clash in round 5, against Collingwood and did not play at senior level again until round 12. In round 13 against St Kilda, he kicked two goals and, alongside other young Bombers, played a role in a fifteen-point win. He then went on to play every game for the remainder of the season. In 2006, his second season, Monfries played 21 games, missing only one game due to a minor calf strain.

In 2007, Monfries played 20 out of 22 games, omitted on form for two weeks at midseason. He was, however, named as an emergency for both matches and quickly returned to the team due to pressures caused by injuries and suspensions to other key players.

In 2009, Monfries became a key player within the Essendon Football Club. He defined his role further as a key position forward and finished second in the club's goalkicking after Matthew Lloyd.

On 5 October 2012, Angus told Essendon that he will be leaving and be signing a new four-year deal with Port Adelaide. On 8 October 2012, Essendon announced that Monfries would be traded to Port Adelaide for pick 48. He made his debut for Port Adelaide in round 1, 2013, against Melbourne.

Monfries, along with 33 other past and present Essendon players, was found guilty of using a banned performance-enhancing substance, thymosin beta-4, as part of Essendon's sports supplements program during the 2012 season. He and his teammates were initially found not guilty in March 2015 by the AFL Anti-Doping Tribunal, but a guilty verdict was returned in January 2016 after an appeal by the World Anti-Doping Agency. He was suspended for two years which, with backdating, ended in November 2016; as a result, he served approximately fourteen months of his suspension and missed the entire 2016 AFL season.

At the conclusion of the 2017 season, he announced his retirement from AFL football.

Statistics
 Statistics are correct to the end of the 2012 season.

|- style="background-color: #EAEAEA"
! scope="row" style="text-align:center" | 2005
|  || 6 || 12 || 11 || 7 || 59 || 58 || 117 || 31 || 21 || 0.9 || 0.6 || 4.9 || 4.8 || 9.8 || 2.6 || 1.8
|-
! scope="row" style="text-align:center" | 2006
|  || 6 || 21 || 22 || 11 || 174 || 125 || 299 || 99 || 47 || 1.0 || 0.5 || 8.3 || 6.0 || 14.2 || 4.7 || 2.2
|- style="background-color: #EAEAEA"
! scope="row" style="text-align:center" | 2007
|  || 6 || 20 || 16 || 12 || 180 || 115 || 295 || 92 || 49 || 0.8 || 0.6 || 9.0 || 5.8 || 14.8 || 4.6 || 2.4
|-
! scope="row" style="text-align:center" | 2008
|  || 6 || 19 || 18 || 10 || 175 || 134 || 309 || 96 || 47 || 1.0 || 0.5 || 9.2 || 7.0 || 16.3 || 5.0 || 2.5
|- style="background-color: #EAEAEA"
! scope="row" style="text-align:center" | 2009
|  || 6 || 21 || 25 || 15 || 168 || 162 || 330 || 116 || 51 || 1.2 || 0.7 || 8.0 || 7.7 || 15.7 || 5.5 || 2.4
|-
! scope="row" style="text-align:center" | 2010
|  || 6 || 17 || 24 || 10 || 134 || 130 || 264 || 71 || 46 || 1.4 || 0.6 || 7.9 || 7.6 || 15.5 || 4.2 || 2.7
|- style="background-color: #EAEAEA"
! scope="row" style="text-align:center" | 2011
|  || 6 || 22 || 31 || 12 || 186 || 207 || 393 || 96 || 90 || 1.4 || 0.6 || 8.4 || 9.4 || 17.9 || 4.4 || 4.1
|-
! scope="row" style="text-align:center" | 2012
|  || 6 || 18 || 18 || 15 || 145 || 126 || 271 || 71 || 52 || 1.0 || 0.8 || 8.1 || 7.0 || 15.1 || 3.9 || 2.9
|- class="sortbottom"
! colspan=3| Career
! 150
! 165
! 92
! 1221
! 1057
! 2278
! 672
! 403
! 1.1
! 0.6
! 8.1
! 7.0
! 15.2
! 4.5
! 2.7
|}

References

External links

1987 births
Living people
Sturt Football Club players
Essendon Football Club players
Port Adelaide Football Club players
Port Adelaide Football Club players (all competitions)
People educated at Pembroke School, Adelaide
Australian rules footballers from South Australia
Doping cases in Australian rules football
Australia international rules football team players